This article details the Halifax Panthers rugby league football club's 2023 season. This is the Panthers' fifteenth consecutive season in the Championship.

Pre-season friendlies

RFL Championship

Matches

Challenge Cup

Squad statistics

 Appearances and points include (Championship, Challenge Cup and Play-offs) as of 09 January 2023.

Transfers

In

Out

Notes

Explanatory notes

Citations 

Halifax Panthers